Edgar Ashton Fortescue Croft (7 May 1872 – 22 September 1946) was an Australian rules football player for the Essendon Football Club. He played in three seasons for the Bombers, playing 15 matches and scoring 12 goals. He has the unique distinction of scoring Essendon's very first League goal.

He is famous for kicking the sealing goal for Essendon against Melbourne in the match that would decide the 1897 premiership. Under the farcical round robin finals series of 1897, Essendon needed to win their final match against Melbourne to win the flag. Croft kicked the only goal of the game, after a shocking kick by Essendon player Charlie Forbes skewed into the pocket for Croft to mark and goal.

Croft was known to have suffered many dislocations and fractures which caused him to miss a lot of games. Croft stayed involved at the club for years after his playing career, as a patron until 1918.

Croft died in 1946.

References

External links

1872 births
Australian rules footballers from Melbourne
Essendon Football Club players
Essendon Football Club Premiership players
1946 deaths
People educated at Scotch College, Melbourne
One-time VFL/AFL Premiership players
People from Carlton, Victoria